Kamaljit Neeru, or simply Neeru, is a Punjabi singer and dancer. She is known for her stage performances as well has her vocal quality. She has released a total of ten albums to date. Her most popular songs to date are; Seeti Te Seeti, Jadon Mera Lak Hilda, Rurha Mandi Jave, and Bhij Gaye Kurti Laal.

Biography 
Neeru began her career as a hobby in England in 1982, at the time, the Punjabi community there was beginning to create its own musical identity. Originally Punjabi music had all come from the Punjab, but there was a small Bhangra community in its infancy which was gaining popularity quite quickly. This was led by artists such as Alaap Group, Heera Group, Apna Sangeet, A.S Kang and DCS.

One day, while having dinner, a family friend Baldev Mastana who was a well-known music director in England asked Neeru to join his group The Saathi’s.

Neeru's first album was a collaboration with other artists, Duppatte Kale Urde which was released in 1982 with HMV. In this Album, Neeru performed her single Behja Behja Hoju Mitra.

Following the success of her single in the album, Neeru went on to release 9 solo albums and 7 collaborations with other artists such as Hans Raj Hans, Sardool Sikander, Harbhajan Mann, Sabar Koti, Satwinder Bugga, Amar Noori and the late Parminder Sandhu.

When she began her career, it was very difficult for a female singer to receive any degree or measurable success as a stage artist in the male dominated environment of Punjabi music, however she was able to break through these barriers and gain considerable success.

Neeru has performed in almost each and every town and city in Punjab. She has performed in New Zealand, Australia, Dubai, Singapore, Malaysia, Holland, England, Canada and America.

Neeru most recently has released three singles between 2017 and 2018 including Jago Wali Raat and her first devotional song Tor Dita Lalan Nu. In addition, she has been active on Punjabi Television as a judge on Miss PTC Punjabi in all seasons during 2017 and 2018 along with judging Mr. Punjab (Canada episode) in 2017.

Personal life 
Neeru is originally from Khanna, India. She is one of five siblings. Her father was an officer in the Indian Military and due to this she traveled throughout India as a child. While in school, she was an avid track and field player and also took interest in swimming. Prior to her marriage, she was studying for her pre-medical avenue of education, however, when she was married, she moved to the United Kingdom in 1980 putting her education on hold and beginning her hobby in singing which became her profession.

Neeru currently resides in Vancouver with her husband and her son, a police officer.

Discography

Mixed albums

Filmography

References

Living people
Indian women pop singers
Year of birth missing (living people)